1659 Punkaharju, provisional designation , is a stony Postremian asteroid from the middle region of the asteroid belt, approximately 30 kilometers in diameter. It was discovered on 28 December 1940, by Finnish astronomer Yrjö Väisälä at Turku Observatory in Southwest Finland. It is named for the municipality of Punkaharju.

Orbit 

Punkaharju is a member of the Postrema family, a mid-sized central asteroid family of little more than 100 members. The S-type asteroid orbits the Sun at a distance of 2.1–3.5 AU once every 4 years and 8 months (1,698 days). Its orbit has an eccentricity of 0.26 and an inclination of 16° with respect to the ecliptic.

Rotation period 

Between 2000 and 2011, several rotational lightcurves of Punkaharju were obtained from photometric observations by astronomers Brian Warner and Pierre Antonini. They gave a well-defined rotation period of 5.01 hours with a brightness variation between 0.26 and 0.43 magnitude. In addition, a concurring period of 5.01327 hours was published in 2016, using the Uppsala Asteroid Photometric Catalogue as the main-data source. French CCD-specialist Cyril Cavadore also derived a less secure period of 5.028 hours from his observations in October 2005.

Diameter and albedo 

According to the surveys carried out by the Infrared Astronomical Satellite IRAS, the Japanese Akari satellite, and NASA's Wide-field Infrared Survey Explorer with its subsequent NEOWISE mission, the asteroid measures between 28.01 and 31.21 kilometers in diameter, and its surface has an albedo between 0.165 and 0.271. The Collaborative Asteroid Lightcurve Link derives an albedo of 0.196 and a diameter of 31.41 kilometers using an absolute magnitude of 9.9.

Naming 

This minor planet is named for the former municipality of Punkaharju, an isthmus region in southeastern Finland (also see Karelian Isthmus). The official  was published by the Minor Planet Center on 20 February 1976.

References

External links 
 Lightcurve plot of 1659 Punkaharju, Palmer Divide Observatory, B. D. Warner (2000)
 Asteroid Lightcurve Database (LCDB), query form (info )
 Dictionary of Minor Planet Names, Google books
 Asteroids and comets rotation curves, CdR – Observatoire de Genève, Raoul Behrend
 Discovery Circumstances: Numbered Minor Planets (1)-(5000) – Minor Planet Center
 
 

001659
Discoveries by Yrjö Väisälä
Named minor planets
001659
19401228